Westover Christian Academy is a private, non-denominational Christian school in Danville, Virginia.

It began operations in 1979 as Southall Christian School.  Southall was located at 502 Southampton Ave. on the south side of Danville.  Founded on location of Southall Baptist Church, it started as a primary school with the plan to add a grade each year.  It graduated its first class in 1986. The class consisted of six students. It continued operations until Southall Baptist merged with Lynn Haven Baptist and moved the school into a newer and more modern facility on the north side of town.  The new church, Westover Baptist, and school, Westover Christian Academy took their name from the area of town it was located.  It recently graduated 29 students in 2009.

External links
Westover Ministries

Christian schools in Virginia
Schools in Danville, Virginia
Private high schools in Virginia
Private middle schools in Virginia
Private elementary schools in Virginia